Kamala Hampana (Kannada: ಕಮಲಾ ಹಂಪನಾ) (born 28 October 1935)  is an Indian writer in Kannada language and Jainism. She was born at Devanahalli, Bangalore, Karnataka. She worked as a scholar, a professor, and a follower of ancient Archaic works. She has undertaken serious study and research in various genres of Kannada literature and has developed some of the most serious ideas of various genres.

Early days
Kamala Hampana was born on October 28, 1935, In Devanahalli, Bangalore, Karnataka to C. Rangadhamanayak and Lakshmamma couple. Kamala's elementary schooling started in Challakere, Karnataka and continued in different villages, In 1935, as a high school student she completed her SSLC at Tumkur. She continued her college studies in Mysore. During 1955-1958, From University of Mysore she obtained a B.A degree and an M.A degree in the Kannada language (1958). She was conferred a Ph.D. degree for her thesis on Turanga Bhaarata.

Kamala Hampana is married to Hampa Nagarajaiah who also a veteran litterateur in Kannada. The couple have two daughters and a son.

Career
In 1959, Hampana started with the profession as Kannada teacher and worked as a Principal at the Government First Grade College, Vijayanagar, Bangalore and then as a Professor at the Maharani Colleges of Bangalore and Maharaja's College, Mysore.

Upon her retirement from the Government Service, She worked as a Professor in Department of Jainism, Natural Studies, President of Mysore University and President and Visiting Professor of Hampi University. Her research on female sensibility has earned her with immense fame, 
In her writings, she has provided a deep insight into Jain works.

Literary works
Hampana's areas of works include ancient Kannada literature, Jainology and textual criticism. She has been involved in dalit movement and women’s movement in Karnataka. Kamala has published more than fifty books in various genres of literature such as literary criticism, poetry, fiction and biography.

Hampana's important publications are:

Story compilation (ಕಥಾಸಂಕಲನ)
 Nekkitu Haalina Battalu (ನಕ್ಕಿತು ಹಾಲಿನ ಬಟ್ಟಲು)
 Rekke Muriditthu (ರೆಕ್ಕೆ ಮುರಿದಿತ್ತು)
 Chandana (ಚಂದನಾ)
 Bavane (ಬಣವೆ)

Research 
 Thuranga Bharata - Ondu Addhyayana (ತುರಂಗ ಭಾರತ - ಒಂದು ಅಧ್ಯಯನ)
 Shantinaatha (ಶಾಂತಿನಾಥ)
 Adharsha Jaina Mahileyaru (ಆದರ್ಶ ಜೈನ ಮಹಿಳೆಯರು)
 Anekanathavaada (ಅನೇಕಾಂತವಾದ)
 Naadu Nudi Naavu (ನಾಡು ನುಡಿ ನಾವು)
 jaina Saahitya Parisara (ಜೈನ ಸಾಹಿತ್ಯ ಪರಿಸರ)
 Baddavana (ಬದ್ದವಣ)
 Roonada Basadi (ರೋಣದ ಬಸದಿ)
 Mahamandaleshwari Rani Chennabhairadevi Mattu Ithra Karavali Raniyaru (ಮಹಾಮಂಡಲೇಶ್ವರಿ ರಾಣಿ ಚೆನ್ನಭೈರಾದೇವಿ ಮತ್ತು ಇತರ ಕರಾವಳಿ ರಾಣಿಯರು)

Review, rational 
 Baasinga (ಬಾಸಿಂಗ)
 Baandala (ಬಾಂದಳ)
 Badabaagni (ಬಡಬಾಗ್ನಿ)
 Bittara (ಬಿತ್ತರ)
 Bonbala (ಬೊಂಬಾಳ)
 Gunadamkakaarti Attimabbe (ಗುಣದಂಕಕಾರ್ತಿ ಅತ್ತಿಮಬ್ಬೆ)
 Attimabbe and Chalukyas

Editing works 

 Sukumaara Chariteya Sangraha (ಸುಕುಮಾರ ಚರಿತೆಯ ಸಂಗ್ರಹ)
 Bharatesha Vaibhava (ಭರತೇಶ ವೈಭವ)
 K. S. Dharanedraih's Smriti grantha (ಕೆ.ಎಸ್.ಧರಣೇಂದ್ರಯ್ಯನವರ ಸ್ಮೃತಿಗ್ರಂಥ)
 Sree Pacche (ಶ್ರೀ ಪಚ್ಚೆ)
 Sahastraabhisheka (ಸಹಸ್ರಾಭಿಷೇಕ)
 Chavundaraya Purana (ಚಾವುಂಡರಾಯ ಪುರಾಣ)
 Dr D.N. Narasimhacharya's chosen articles (ಡಾ.ಡಿ.ಎನ್.ನರಸಿಂಹಾಚಾರ್ಯರ ಆಯ್ದ ಲೇಖನಗಳು)
 Haleya Gadya Saahithya (ಹಳೆಯ ಗದ್ಯ ಸಾಹಿತ್ಯ)
 Daanachintamani - Smaranachintane) (ದಾನಚಿಂತಾಮಣಿ - ಸ್ಮರಣಸಂಚಿಕೆ)
 jaina Dharma (ಜೈನಧರ್ಮ)
 Suvrna Bhaarathi- Part-3 (ಸುವರ್ಣ ಭಾರತಿ- ಸಂಪುಟ- ೩)
 jaina kathakosha (Co-author) (ಜೈನಕಥಾಕೋಶ)
 Shodasha Bhavana Kavya (ಷೋಡಶ ಭಾವಾನಾ ಕಾವ್ಯ)

Introduction to life 
 Mahaveerara Jeevana Sandesha (ಮಹಾವೀರರ ಜೀವನ ಸಂದೇಶ)
 Mudimallige (ಮುಡಿಮಲ್ಲಿಗೆ)
 Aa Mukha (ಆ ಮುಖ)

Vachana Sankalana 
 Bindali (ಬಿಂದಲಿ)
 Bugadi (ಬುಗುಡಿ)

Children's books 
 Akkamahadevi (ಅಕ್ಕ ಮಹಾದೇವಿ)
 Helavanakatte Giriyamma (ಹೆಳವನಕಟ್ಟೆ ಗಿರಿಯಮ್ಮ)
 Veeravanithe Obavva (ವೀರವನಿತೆಓಬವ್ವ)
 Janna (ಜನ್ನ)
 Chikkavarigaagi Chithradurga (ಚಿಕ್ಕವರಿಗಾಗಿ ಚಿತ್ರದುರ್ಗ)
 Dr B.R. Ambedkar (ಡಾ.ಬಿ.ಆರ್.ಅಂಬೇಡ್ಕರ್)
 Mualabagilu (ಮುಳಬಾಗಿಲು)
 Makkalodane Maathukathe (ಮಕ್ಕಳೊಡನೆ ಮಾತುಕತೆ)

Translation 
 Beejakshara Maale (ಬೀಜಾಕ್ಷರ ಮಾಲೆ) - Saraswati Baigiri's melody of 65 verses written in Telugu.
 Jaathi Nirmoolane (ಜಾತಿ ನಿರ್ಮೂಲನೆ) - Translation of Dr. Ambedkar's Annihilation of caste
 Bharatadalli Jathigalu (ಭಾರತದಲ್ಲಿ ಜಾತಿಗಳು)
 Asiada Hanathegalu (ಏಷಿಯಾದ ಹಣತೆಗಳು)
 jaanthi Mimase (ಜಾತಿಮೀಮಾಂಸೆ)

Akashavaani drama - metaphors 
 Baluku (ಬಕುಳ)
 Banaadi (ಬಾನಾಡಿ)
 Bellakki (ಬೆಳ್ಳಕ್ಕಿ)

Autobiography
 Beru-Benki-Bilalu

Awards and recognition
Kamala Hampana received the following awards and citations:
 Kamala Hampana was President of the 7th Kannada Sahitya Sammelana (All India Kannada Literary Conference) held at Mudbidri in December, 2003. 
 Karnataka Sahitya Academy Award
 Karnataka Government's Kitturu Raani Channamma Award (2019) 
 Daana Chintamani Attimabbe Award in 1998 by Karnataka Government
 Rajyotsava Prashasti from Karnataka Government
 Baba Amte Award
 Chavundaraya Award from Kannada Sahitya Parishat (2012)
 Nadoja honorary doctorate from Hampi Kannada University (2008)
 Anupama Niranjana Award (2003)
 Siddanthakeerthi Vidvath Award (2013)
 Rashtra Kavi Kuvempu Award (2013)
 Kuvempu Kalavikethana Award
 Ranna Prashasthi (1996)
 Dr. Baba saheb Ambedkar Award (2007)
 Bharat Vikas Ratna Award
 Shruta Samvardhan Rashtreeya Puraskar
 Mahamastakabhisheka rashtreeya Puraskara
 Sandesha Awards 2017

References

External links
 Kamala Hampana Books at Sapna books
 

1935 births
Living people
Indian women children's writers
Indian children's writers
Kannada people
Kannada-language writers
20th-century Indian novelists
20th-century Indian women writers
21st-century Indian women writers
21st-century Indian writers
Women writers from Karnataka
Novelists from Karnataka